José Antonio Romera Navarro (born 8 September 1987) is a Spanish professional footballer who plays for CF La Nucía as a right back.

Football career

Early career
Born in Xirivella, Valencian Community, Romera was a Levante UD youth graduate. After making his senior debut while on loan at Tercera División side CD Onda in the 2006–07 season, he returned to Levante and was assigned to the reserve team in Segunda División B.

In 2008 Romera signed for CF Gandía in the fourth division. An immediate first-choice, he achieved promotion to the third division in 2010.

Czech Republic
In 2012, Romera signed for Czech team FK Dukla Prague after impressing on a trial. He made his professional debut on 10 August 2012, coming on as a late substitute for Jan Pázler in a 4–0 home routing of FK Teplice.

Romera signed a new two-year deal with the club on 5 July 2013. He scored his first professional goal on 23 August, netting the opener in a 1–1 home draw against FK Mladá Boleslav.

Romera signed a three-year contract with fellow league team FK Baumit Jablonec on 28 May 2014. A regular starter during his first season, he only featured sparingly in his second.

Dinamo București
On 14 July 2016, Romera signed a one-year contract with Romanian side FC Dinamo București. The following 30 May, he extended his contract for a further campaign.

Almería
On 12 July 2018 free agent Romera returned to his native country, after agreeing to a one-year deal with Segunda División side UD Almería. He made his debut for the club on 17 August, starting in a 0–1 away loss against Cádiz CF.

Romera became an undisputed starter for the Andalusians, and renewed his contract until 2021 on 29 May 2019. On 16 September of the following year, after losing his starting spot to Iván Balliu, he terminated his contract with the club.

Later career
In January 2021 he joined UCAM Murcia, playing half a season before joining CF La Nucía in July 2021.

Honours
Dinamo București
Cupa Ligii: 2016–17

References

External links

1987 births
Living people
Spanish footballers
Footballers from the Valencian Community
Association football defenders
Segunda División players
Segunda División B players
Tercera División players
Atlético Levante UD players
UD Almería players
UCAM Murcia CF players
Czech First League players
FK Dukla Prague players
FK Jablonec players
Liga I players
FC Dinamo București players
Spanish expatriate footballers
Spanish expatriate sportspeople in the Czech Republic
Spanish expatriate sportspeople in Romania
Expatriate footballers in the Czech Republic
Expatriate footballers in Romania
CF Gandía players
CF La Nucía players